During the 1992–93 English football season, Brentford competed in the second tier of English football for the first time since 1953–54. After rising to mid-table by December 1992, just four wins from the final 24 matches relegated the Bees straight back to the Second Division. Brentford played in the Anglo-Italian Cup for the first and only time during the season and lost to Derby County in the semi-finals.

Season summary
Brentford's 1992–93 First Division season was the club's first in the second tier of English football since 1953–54. Manager Phil Holder kept faith with the squad which won the 1991–92 Third Division title, with Jamie Bates, Paul Buckle, Keith Millen, Neil Smillie, Simon Ratcliffe, Chris Hughton, Kevin Godfrey and Lee Luscombe all signing new contracts. The club was hit by the departure of star striker Dean Holdsworth, who refused to sign a new contract and joined Premier League club Wimbledon on 20 July 1992 for a fee which rose to £720,000. As a replacement, Holder signed Grimsby Town forward Murray Jones for a £75,000 fee. Other new signings were midfielders Mickey Bennett and Detzi Kruszyński from Wimbledon (as makeweights in the Holdsworth transfer) and Channel Islands midfielder Grant Chalmers.

As soon as the season began, Brentford suffered an injury hoodoo, losing centre back Terry Evans, goalkeeper Graham Benstead and midfielders Bob Booker and Wilf Rostron to long-term knee injuries. Just two wins from the opening 12 matches left the club in the relegation places and manager Phil Holder was forced to strengthen the team with loanee goalkeeper Gerry Peyton, centre back Shane Westley (purchased from Wolverhampton Wanderers for £100,000) and forward Joe Allon from Chelsea for a club-record £275,000 fee. Brentford came into form in late October 1992, losing just two of 11 matches to rise to 10th place and within three points of the playoff positions by 28 December, with Holder winning the December First Division Manager of the Month award.

A catalogue of injuries to Chris Hughton, Simon Ratcliffe, Neil Smillie and Marcus Gayle in early 1993 saw Brentford lose 11 of 13 league matches and drop to 22nd place. Some solace was found in the Anglo-Italian Cup, with the Bees winning six consecutive matches before falling to Derby County over two legs in the semi-finals. In February and March, manager Holder strengthened the squad by bringing in former England left back Kenny Sansom, midfielder Alan Dickens, winger Paul Stephenson and former loan goalkeeper Gerry Peyton in on permanent deals. The signings and the return to fitness of Terry Evans, Bob Booker, Neil Smillie and Wilf Rostron led to a revival in late March, with Brentford winning twice and drawing three times in a six-match spell.

Successive defeats to West Ham United and Watford in late April put Brentford back into the relegation places, before a 3–1 victory over Barnsley at Griffin Park in the penultimate match of the season elevated the club to 21st place. 4,000 Brentford supporters travelled to Ashton Gate for the final match of the season versus Bristol City, knowing that at the very least, defeat for 22nd place Cambridge United and a draw for 23rd place Birmingham City would see the Bees retain their First Division status. A 4–1 defeat and victory for Birmingham City relegated Brentford back to the Second Division. Manager Phil Holder and assistant manager Wilf Rostron lost their jobs in the wake of the relegation and it wasn't until the 2014–15 season that Brentford again played second-tier football.

League table

Pre-season results

Football League First Division results

League results summary

Results and position by round

Matches

August

September

October

November

December

January

February

March

April

May

 Source: Statto, 11v11, The Big Brentford Book Of The Nineties

Cup results

FA Cup

League Cup

Anglo-Italian Cup

 Source: Statto, 11v11, The Big Brentford Book Of The Nineties

Playing squad 
Players' ages are as of the opening day of the 1992–93 season.

 Source: The Big Brentford Book Of The Nineties

Coaching staff

Statistics

Appearances and goals
Substitute appearances in brackets.

Players listed in italics left the club mid-season.
Source: The Big Brentford Book Of The Nineties

Goalscorers 

Players listed in italics left the club mid-season.
Source: The Big Brentford Book Of The Nineties

Management

Summary

Transfers & loans

Kit

|
|
|
|

Awards 
 Supporters' Player of the Year: Billy Manuel
 Football League First Division Manager of the Month: Phil Holder (December 1992)
 Jewson National Award

References

Brentford F.C. seasons
Brentford